Visakhapatnam ([ʋiʃaːkʰapaʈːɳam]) (nicknamed Vizag) is the largest city, both in terms of area and population, in the Indian state of Andhra Pradesh. It is located on the coast of Bay of Bengal in the north eastern region of the state. It is the administrative headquarters of Visakhapatnam district and also the "financial capital of Andhra Pradesh". Visakhapatnam is now emerging as one of the largest metropolises. It has numerous buildings, mainly 5 to 7 storeys, but only the buildings which have more than 7 floors are mentioned here.

Recently in the city a 35-floor building has been constructed, called Oxygen Towers. LIC Building was once the major construction of Visakhapatnam.

References

Buildings and structures in Visakhapatnam
Visakhapatnam
Andhra Pradesh-related lists